The 2003 CSIO Gijón was the 2003 edition of the Spanish official show jumping horse show, at Las Mestas Sports Complex in Gijón. It was held as CSIO 5*.

This edition of the CSIO Gijón was held between August and September.

Nations Cup
The competition was a show jumping competition with two rounds. The height of the fences were up to 1.60 meters. The best six teams of the eleven which participated were allowed to start in the second round.

Ran on 30 August 2003, Ireland won its first Nations Cup at Gijón ever.

Grey penalties points do not count for the team result.

Gijón Grand Prix
The Gijón Grand Prix, the Show jumping Grand Prix of the 2004 CSIO Gijón, was the major show jumping competition at this event. It was held on 2 August 2004. The competition was a show jumping competition over one round with tie-break for the riders that made 0 points in the main round, the height of the fences were up to 1.60 meters.

Irish Harry Marshall won the competition with Splendido.

References

External links
Official website

CSIO Gijón
2003 in show jumping